Nancy Castiglione (born Nancy Jane Castiglione on February 24, 1981) is a Canadian former actress and singer who worked in the Philippines.

Personal life
She had a relationship with Luis Manzano. She was also linked to actor Empoy Marquez, performer Jeffrey Tam and Hayden Kho. The couple have twins together.

Career
GMA 7 contracted and launched her as one of the mainstream actresses in the TV series, Sana Ay Ikaw Na Nga with Dingdong Dantes and Tanya Garcia. Her exemplary acting performance qualified her for the award as Best New Female Actress in the Star Awards.

After taking some hiatus from limelight, Castiglione reinvents herself and found solitude reflecting on the things she wanted to do in the future. She doesn't want to be packaged as an actress or host only. Like any other artists, she wants some fresh breaks. On her reemergence, Nancy has turned into a singing and dancing diva though she still engages in acting and modeling.

She is now a broker and focusing on her family and work.

Filmography

Television

Films

Discography
Studio albums

Studio Album

References

External links

Nancy's Blog

1981 births
Living people
Star Magic
Actresses from Winnipeg
Filipino people of Italian descent
Filipino television actresses
GMA Network personalities
Musicians from Winnipeg
21st-century Filipino singers
21st-century Filipino women singers